Washington Township, Arkansas may refer to:

 Washington Township, Benton County, Arkansas (historical)
 Washington Township, Boone County, Arkansas (historical)
 Washington Township, Bradley County, Arkansas
 Washington Township, Conway County, Arkansas
 Washington Township, Fulton County, Arkansas
 Washington Township, Grant County, Arkansas
 Washington Township, Independence County, Arkansas
 Washington Township, Jefferson County, Arkansas
 Washington Township, Ouachita County, Arkansas
 Washington Township, Sevier County, Arkansas
 Washington Township, Sharp County, Arkansas
 Washington Township, Stone County, Arkansas
 Washington Township, Van Buren County, Arkansas

See also 
 List of townships in Arkansas
 Washington Township (disambiguation)

Arkansas township disambiguation pages